Audrys Nin Reyes (born 2 January 1995) is an artistic gymnast from the Dominican Republic.

In May 2017, he won the gold medal in the men's vault at the 2017 Osijek World Challenge Cup held in Osijek, Croacia.
In August 2017, he won the gold medal in the men's vault and men's horizontal bar events at the 2017 Pan American Individual Event Artistic Gymnastics Championships held in Lima, Peru. He also won the bronze medal in the men's parallel bars event. In the same month, he represented the Dominican Republic at the 2017 Summer Universiade held in Taipei, Taiwan and he won the gold medal in the men's vault event .

In September 2017, he won the gold medal in the men's vault at the 2017 Paris World Challenge Cup held in Paris, France, performing one of the most difficult vaults in the Code of Points with start value of 6.0. 

Nin Reyes has two elements with his name in the code of Points, specifically in Pommel Horse:  Nin Reyes 1 with a D value and Nin Reyes 2 with an E value, both of these elements belong to the group III: Travel type of elements, traveling Spindles.

In 2018, he represented the Dominican Republic at the 2018 Central American Games held in Barranquilla, Colombia and he won the gold medal in the men's vault also bronze medals in Pommel Horse and All Around. 

In 2019, he represented the Dominican Republic at the 2019 Pan American Games held in Lima, Peru and he won the gold medal in the men's vault event.

References 

https://en.wikipedia.org/wiki/2018_FIG_Artistic_Gymnastics_World_Cup_series

External links 
 

Living people
1995 births
Place of birth missing (living people)
Dominican Republic male artistic gymnasts
Gymnasts at the 2015 Pan American Games
Gymnasts at the 2019 Pan American Games
Medalists at the 2019 Pan American Games
Pan American Games gold medalists for the Dominican Republic
Pan American Games medalists in gymnastics
Medalists at the 2017 Summer Universiade
Universiade medalists in gymnastics
Universiade gold medalists for the Dominican Republic